The  Great Bazaar is a 2006 drama film written and directed by Licínio Azevedo. It is the story of two boys who meet in an African market.

Festivals
 Fribourg Film Festival, Switzerland
 Children Film Festival, London
 Cinema Africa, Sweden
 Rassegna di Cinema Africano, Italy
 FESPACO - Panafrican Film and Television Festival of Ouagadougou, Burkina Faso
 Tampere Film Festival, Finland
 AfryKamera Festival, Poland
 Journées Cinématographiques de Carthage, Tunis 
 Montréal Film Festival, Canada
 Vancouver International Film Festival, Canada

Awards
 Best short film and Public Award at Festival Cinémas d'Afrique à Angers, France (2007)
 FIPA d'Argent at FIPA - Festival International of Audiovisual Programs, France (2006)
 Best Short Film at the 27th Durban International Film Festival, South Africa (2006)
 Best fiction film at CINEPORT, Brazil (2006)
 Best Video at XVI Balafon Film Festival, Italy (2006)
 Best Fiction at 33.ª Jornada Internacional de Cinema da Bahia, Brazil (2006)

See also
 Licínio Azevedo
 ´O Cinema em Moçambique: Licínio Azevedo´
 'Filme de Licínio de Azevedo ganha prata em Biarritz'

External links
 The Great Bazar - IMDb page about The Great Bazar
 The Great Bazar in Africiné
 Article (in Portuguese) in the blog Cine Africa

References 

Mozambican drama films
2006 films
2006 drama films
Films directed by Licínio Azevedo